Euphorbia condylocarpa is a plant species in the genus Euphorbia.

The plant contains the flavonol trifolin.

See also 
 List of Euphorbia species

References

External links 

condylocarpa